Yale is a village in Jasper County, Illinois, United States. The population was 86 at the 2010 census.

Geography
Yale is located in northeastern Jasper County. Illinois Route 49 passes through the village, leading north  to Casey and south  to its terminus at Illinois Route 33 near Willow Hill.

Demographics

As of the census of 2000, there were 97 people, 37 households, and 26 families residing in the village. The racial makeup of the village was 98.97% White and 1.03% Native American. Hispanic or Latino of any race were 1.03% of the population.

There were 37 households, out of which 40.5% had children under the age of 18 living with them, 59.5% were married couples living together, 8.1% had a female householder with no husband present, and 29.7% were non-families. 27.0% of all households were made up of individuals, and 16.2% had someone living alone who was 65 years of age or older. The average household size was 2.62 and the average family size was 3.15.

In the village, the population was spread out, with 28.9% under the age of 18, 7.2% from 18 to 24, 28.9% from 25 to 44, 20.6% from 45 to 64, and 14.4% who were 65 years of age or older. The median age was 36 years. For every 100 females, there were 102.1 males. For every 100 females age 18 and over, there were 86.5 males.

The median income for a household in the village was $21,136, and the median income for a family was $21,250. Males had a median income of $27,917 versus $16,250 for females. The per capita income for the village was $18,199. There were 24.0% of families and 29.1% of the population living below the poverty line, including 29.0% of under eighteens and 14.3% of those over 64.

References

Villages in Jasper County, Illinois
Villages in Illinois